Listen, Germany! is the published collection of letters by exiled German author Thomas Mann to his former country during World War II. Originally published in 1943 by Alfred A. Knopf Inc., these letters, twenty-five of them, were read over long and medium wave radio broadcasts being made by the BBC into Nazi Germany as part of the allied propaganda effort from October 1940 to August 1943.

The German language original, Deutsche Hörer! ("German listeners!" — this is how each of the texts starts) was first published in 1942 by H. Wolff, New York but never reached Germany. A second edition was published in Stockholm in 1945, after the end of the war.  This edition included the addresses Mann had given up to November 8, 1945.

Edition

Thomas Mann: Deutsche Hörer! Radiosendungen nach Deutschland aus den Jahren 1940-1945, 4th edition (Fischer: Frankfurt am Main, 2004).

1943 non-fiction books
Books by Thomas Mann
World War II and the media
Alfred A. Knopf books
Collections of letters